Maria Leonor Ribeiro Tavares, also known as Eleonor Tavares, (born 24 September 1985 in Paris, France) is a French-born Portuguese pole vaulter. She competed at the 2012 Summer Olympics.

Born in France to Portuguese parents of Cape Verdean descent, she has two older sisters who also compete in the pole vault, Sandra-Helena Homo and Elisabete Ansel.

Her personal bests in the event are 4.50 metres outdoors (Albi 2011) and 4.43 metres indoors (Aulnay-sous-Bois 2014). Both are current national records.

Competition record

References 
IAAF profile

1985 births
Living people
Athletes from Paris
Portuguese female pole vaulters
French female pole vaulters
Portuguese people of Cape Verdean descent
French people of Portuguese descent
French sportspeople of Cape Verdean descent
Athletes (track and field) at the 2012 Summer Olympics
Olympic athletes of Portugal
Athletes (track and field) at the 2016 Summer Olympics
Athletes (track and field) at the 2018 Mediterranean Games
Mediterranean Games competitors for Portugal